Boomtown is the fifth studio album by American rock band Ozma, funded entirely by a Pledge Music campaign and released on February 11, 2014.

Writing and Info
Boomtown was Ozma's first effort in seven years following 2007's Pasadena. It opens with "Around The World In 80 Seconds," Ozma's first instrumental since The Doubble Donkey Disc's "Korobeiniki." "Nervous" is notable as the first Ozma song written by drummer Kenn Shane, and the first lead vocal by keyboardist Star Wick. "Out The Window" is only the second Ozma song (the other being The Doubble Donkey Disc's "Immigration Song") to feature rhythm guitarist Jose Galvez on lead vocals. Daniel Brummel only sings lead on two of the songs.

Track listing

References

Ozma (band) albums
2014 albums